Sinara Transport Machines is a Russian transportation vehicle manufacturing and engineering company based in Ekaterinburg. The company was established in 2007 as a division of the Sinara Group.

Subsidiaries
The division incorporates the following subsidiaries:
 Trading House STM
 Ural Diesel Engine Plant
 Lyudinovsky Locomotive Plant
 Center for Innovation Development STM
 Kaluga Plant of Track Machines and Hydraulic Drives
 STM-Service
 SinaraPromTrans
 Ural Locomotives: a joint venture with Siemens created in 2010; manufacturing facilities were based at the Ural Railway Engineering Plant.

STM research centre
The STM research centre (ООО Центр инновационного развития CТМ) was created in 2010 to develop new railway locomotives and technologies.

References

External links
 Official website

Locomotive manufacturers of Russia
Sinara Group
Diesel engine manufacturers
Manufacturing companies based in Yekaterinburg
Engine manufacturers of Russia